Blyth Academy Qatar (BAQ) is a private JK-12 international school in Doha, Qatar. BAQ has existed since 2006, and has carried the Alberta accreditation since 2010 The school operates from grades kindergarten to grade 12.

Curriculum

Blyth Academy Qatar is accredited by the Ministry of Education of Alberta, Canada and the Ministry of Education of the State of Qatar. BAQ follows the Alberta curriculum which is widely recognized and ranks amongst the top educational systems in the world. Students obtaining an Alberta Secondary School Diploma are accepted to universities and colleges across the world.

References

External links 

International schools in Qatar
2006 establishments in Qatar
Educational institutions established in 2006
Schools in Doha
Canadian international schools in Qatar